A Picturesque and Descriptive View of the City of Dublin is a set of 25 architectural prints of well-known buildings and views in Dublin, Ireland illustrated by the engraver, watercolourist, and draughtsman James Malton at the end of the 18th century. At the time of drawing in 1791, many of the buildings had been newly constructed and marked a high point of architecture, wealth, and political prominence of the city of Dublin. Malton's prints are arguably, the most important series of drawings of Dublin to the present day and almost all of the buildings illustrated still stand and maintain their position at the centre of Irish social, cultural, educational, political, commercial, and legal life.

The drawings have been copied and reproduced hundreds of times and have become synonymous with the development and progression of the city.

References

External links
 

Irish art
Georgian architecture in Ireland
Buildings and structures in Dublin (city)
Neoclassical architecture in Ireland